"The Bad Photographer" is a 1998 song written and performed by British pop group Saint Etienne, and released as the second single from their fourth album, Good Humor (1998). It is produced by Swedish record producer, composer and musician Tore Johansson, and peaked at number 27 on the UK Singles Chart. The song also reached number 24 in Scotland and number four on the UK Indie Singles Chart.

Critical reception
A reviewer from Herald Sun declared "The Bad Photographer" as "another outstanding track. This time, acoustic guitar and inventive bass lines drive a cheery and fun tune." The Mirror viewed it as "quirky". Mike Pattenden from Music Week commented in his album review, that the song, with "Sylvie" and "Mr Donut", "all share a groove underpinned by warm, almost jazzy tones." Claudia Connell from News of the World noted, "The catchy track mixes classic pop with a sing-along chorus to produce a swinging Sixties feel and one of the most commercial numbers in the band's eight-year career." Joshua Klein from Pitchfork remarked that the band is "embracing the 1960s as fervently as ever" on tracks like "The Bad Photographer". Fiona Shepherd from The Scotsman said it's "about a seedy snapper." A reviewer from Sunday Mirror rated it nine out of ten, adding, "I'd make this the best summer song of the year even if I wasn't madly in lust with Sarah Cracknell. It's just so humdingeringly hummable." Charlie Porter from The Times constated, "Happily, The Bad Photographer offers intelligence and verve in throwaway pop; the simple chorus nags, the lite guitars sound cool and Ms Cracknell sounds angelic as she tells the tale of a fashion photographer with a dirty mind."

Track listing
 CD single, CD1, Europe (1998)
"The Bad Photographer" – 4:15
"Hit the Brakes" – 3:49
"Swim Swan Swim" – 3:07
"Madeleine" – 3:59

 CD single, CD2, Europe (1998)
"The Bad Photographer" (Radio Mix) – 4:02
"4:35 in the Morning" (Kid Loco Mix) – 4:39
"Foto Stat" (Bronx Dogs Mix) – 7:21
"Uri Geller Bent My Boyfriend" (Add N To X Mix) – 6:08

Charts

References

1998 singles
Saint Etienne (band) songs
Songs written by Bob Stanley (musician)
Songs written by Pete Wiggs
1998 songs
Songs written by Sarah Cracknell
Creation Records singles